Imma assita is a moth in the family Immidae. It was described by John Frederick Gates Clarke in 1986. It is found in French Polynesia.

References

Moths described in 1986
Immidae
Moths of Oceania